Ernest Richard Webber Jr. (born June 4, 1942) is a senior United States district judge of the United States District Court for the Eastern District of Missouri.

Education and career

Webber was born in Kahoka, Missouri. He received a Bachelor of Science degree from the University of Missouri in 1964, and a Juris Doctor from University of Missouri School of Law in 1967. He moved to Memphis, Missouri, and served as a prosecuting attorney for several counties in Missouri: for Schuyler County from 1967 to 1975, for Scotland County from 1969 to 1971, and for Putnam County in 1968. He was also a circuit court judge for the first Judicial Circuit of Missouri from 1979 to 1996.

Federal judicial service

Webber is a United States District Judge of the United States District Court for the Eastern District of Missouri. Webber was nominated by President Bill Clinton on August 10, 1995, to a seat vacated by Edward Louis Filippine. He was confirmed by the United States Senate on December 22, 1995, and received his commission on December 26, 1995. He assumed senior status on June 30, 2009.

External links

1942 births
Judges of the United States District Court for the Eastern District of Missouri
Living people
Missouri state court judges
People from Kahoka, Missouri
United States district court judges appointed by Bill Clinton
University of Missouri alumni
University of Missouri School of Law alumni
People from Memphis, Missouri
20th-century American judges
21st-century American judges